The Murray-Sunset, Hattah and Annuello Important Bird Area comprises 7004 km2 of mallee habitat in the Mallee region of north-western Victoria, Australia.

Description
The IBA encompasses several protected areas with blocks of contiguous uncleared native vegetation.  It includes three large area of protected land – most of the Murray-Sunset National Park and the Annuello Nature Conservation Reserve, and the whole of the Hattah-Kulkyne National Park – with some smaller reserves.

Birds
The site has been identified by BirdLife International as an Important Bird Area (IBA) because it supports populations of globally threatened malleefowl, black-eared miners and mallee emu-wren, as well as red-lored whistlers, regent parrots and purple-gaped honeyeaters.  In the Hattah lakes it contains ephemeral wetlands which occasionally support large numbers of waterbirds, including hoary-headed grebes, freckled ducks, Pacific black ducks, grey teals, hardheads, pink-eared ducks, black-fronted dotterels and Australian pelicans.

Threats
A management need is to reduce the incidence of large-scale, high intensity, bushfires in the park, allied with ongoing research on fire management strategies for conservation of threatened mallee species.

References

Important Bird Areas of Victoria (Australia)
Mallee (Victoria)
Mallee Woodlands and Shrublands